And Then... Along Comes the Association is the debut studio album by the Association, released on Valiant Records in July 1966. It became one of the top-selling albums in America, peaking at number five, and remains the Association's most successful album release, except for their Greatest Hits compilation. The album's success was primarily credited to the inclusion of their two U.S. hits "Along Comes Mary" and "Cherish", which peaked at number seven and number one respectively on the Billboard Hot 100; "Cherish" was number one on Billboard's Top 40 list for three weeks starting in September 24, 1966.

The album was preceded by a few non-LP singles as the Association struggled to establish themselves a commercial presence. Moving from the Jubilee record label to Valiant Records, the group released a cover version of Bob Dylan's "One Too Many Mornings", which received attention from Curt Boettcher. Boettcher, who had previously worked with the folk-rock group the GoldeBriars, and demoed "Along Comes Mary" with lead guitarist Jules Alexander, was brought in by the group to steer the Association in a pop-rock musical direction. Aside from "Along Comes Mary", the sessions with Boettcher provided the band with the song's B-side, "Your Own Love", and two other tracks that are featured on the album "Remember" and "I'll Be Your Man". The Association yielded some of the instrumental playing on And Then... Along Comes the Association to top L.A. session musicians, including guitarist Mike Deasy (who would continue to play on other Association albums), bassist Jerry Scheff, and percussionists Jim Troxel and Toxey French.

And Then... Along Comes the Association saw the group experiment with luscious vocal harmonies that anticipated the musical textures of Boettcher's later groups the Millennium and Sagittarius. In addition, the album incorporated a wide assortment of influences, including folk-rock, psychedelia, baroque pop, and remains a cornerstone of sunshine pop. Along with the hit singles "Along Comes Mary" and "Cherish", notable tracks on the album include the reflective "Enter the Young" and the Addrissi brothers' "Don't Blame It on Me". The partnership between the Association and Boettcher—while innovative and commercially successful—was cut short after Boettcher began to overreach his authority in the group's musical direction. For their sophomore effort, Renaissance, the Association recruited Jerry Yester to replace Boettcher as a producer.

Track listing

Personnel
Adapted from the liner notes of Now Sounds 2011 reissue, except where noted:

The Association
 Jules Alexander – vocals, guitar
 Ted Bluechel, Jr. – vocals
 Brian Cole – vocals
 Russ Giguere – vocals
 Terry Kirkman – vocals; recorder on "Along Comes Mary"
 Jim Yester – vocals
Additional musicians
 Jim Bell – oboe
 Ben Benay – guitar
 Hal Blaine – drums
 Curt Boettcher – vocals, tone generator/oscillator
 Clark Burroughs – vocal arrangements
 Mike Deasy – guitar
 Toxey French – drums, percussion, vibraphone
 Mike Henderson – piano, keyboards
 Lee Mallory – guitar
 Butch Parker – piano, keyboards
 Doug Rhodes – celesta
 Jerry Scheff – bass guitar
 Jim Troxel – drums, percussion
Technical
 Curt Boettcher – producer
 Gary Paxton, Pete Romano – engineers
 Peter Whorf Graphics – album design
 Fred Poore – photography
 Phyllis Burgess – original liner notes

References

The Association albums
1966 debut albums
Albums produced by Curt Boettcher
Valiant Records albums